Behera is a town in Kalahandi, Odisha, India.

Behera may also refer to:
 Behera Sahi, a village in Odisha
 Behera (surname), a family name of various communities